The Bell County Expo Center is a 6,559-seat multi-purpose arena, in Belton, Texas. It was formerly the home of the Texas Bullets (PIFL), the CenTex Barracudas (IFL), the Central Texas Stampede (WPHL) and the Central Texas Blackhawks (and later Central Texas Marshalls). The arena opened in 1987. In 2017, it was home to the CenTex Cavalry of Champions Indoor Football.

The Expo Center also hosts a wide variety of events, including fairs/carnivals, rodeos, concerts, local high school graduations, banquets, Livestock shows, conventions, Booster Clubs and Home and Garden/Craft shows, and is home to the Texas Rodeo Cowboy Hall of Fame.

External links

 Official Bell County Expo Center Web Site

Indoor arenas in Texas
American football venues in Texas
Buildings and structures in Bell County, Texas
Rodeo venues in the United States